Homagama is a town in the Colombo District, Sri Lanka, about  south-east of Colombo. The Homagama Pradeshiya Sabha consists of the Homagama divisional secretariat and 10 GN division of Padukka DS division. The Pradeshiya Sabha was established under act No 15 of 1987, and has the highest population of any pradeshiya sabha area in Sri Lanka. It is home to notable places, such as the campus of the National School of Business Management, Sri Lanka Institute of Nanotechnology, the Panagoda Cantonment, Upali Newspapers, Mahinda Rajapaksha College Homagama, St. Michael's College, Homagama, Buddhist and Pali University of Sri Lanka, Ceylon Biscuits Limited and the Laxapana Battery Company.

Demographics 
Data is drawn from the 2012 national census.

Transport 
Homagama sits along the A4 Highway connecting it to both Colombo and Avissawella and beyond. The town is served by two rail lines (Kelani Valley and Homagama) with 66 trains a day connecting Homagama's two rail stations (one located 300 m north of Homagama junction along the Athurugiriya road and one opposite the Homagama hospital) with Maradana and Avissawella.

Homagama is also served by a significant bus service both internally and as through-routes:

Through-routes
69/122 – Maharagama – Kandy
18/122 Hatton
98/122 Ampara
99 – Colombo – Badulla – Welimada – Passara
122 – Colombo – Avissawella – Ratnapura – Embilipitiya – Sooriyawewa – Rakwana – Sewanagala – Urubokka
124 – Maharagama – Ihala Bope
125 – Pettah – Padukka – Ingiriya
128 – Kottawa – Kiriwattuduwa – Yakahaluwa
128/1 – Maharagama – Munamalewatta
129 – Kottawa – Moragahahena
138/4 Henegama – Pettah
138/128 Thalagala – Pettah
366/138 Dimuthulanda – Pettah

Routes originating from/terminating at Homagama
126 – NSBM (via Godagama)
128 – Kottawa – Thalagala (via Homagama Hospital)
128/1 – Maharagama – Munamalewatte (via Homagama)
128/2 – Temple Junction
128/3 – Govijanapadaya
128/6 – Kuruduwatte (via kahathuduwa)
138 – Pettah (via Kottawa, Maharagama, Nugegoda, Kirulapana, Thummulla, Slave Island, Fort)
149 – Piliyandala (via Kahathuduwa)
203 – Horagala (via Godagama / old Rd Meegoda / Dampe / Horagala West)
219 – Hanwella (via Meegoda)
293 – Hanwella (via Godagama)
299 – Lenegala (via Nawalamulla Road)
299/1 – Nawalamulla
299/2 – Walpita
308 – Maharagama (via Niyandagala & Kottawa)
313 – Kalubowila (via Nugegoda)
366 – Halbarawa (via Godagama / Old Rd Wataraka / Horagala East / Halbarawa )
366/1 – Horagala (via Godagama / Old Rd Wataraka / Horagala West)
392 – Migodadeniya
697 – Kaduwela (via Athurugiriya)
698 – Kaduwela (via Panagoda)

References 

Populated places in Western Province, Sri Lanka